The 1976 Eastern Michigan Hurons baseball team represented Eastern Michigan University in the 1976 NCAA Division I baseball season. The Hurons played their home games at Oestrike Stadium. The team was coached by Ron Oestrike in his 13th season at Eastern Michigan.

The Hurons lost the College World Series, defeated by the Arizona Wildcats in the championship game. No northern school would play for a College World Series title for 43 years, until Michigan in 2019.

Roster

Schedule 

! style="" | Regular Season
|- valign="top" 

|- align="center" bgcolor="#ccffcc"
| March 19 || at California State || 12–5 || 1–0 || –
|- align="center" bgcolor="#ccffcc"
| March 20 || at  || 6–5 || 2–0 || –
|- align="center" bgcolor="#ffcccc"
| March 20 || at Loyola Marymount || 3–4 || 2–1 || –
|- align="center" bgcolor="#ccffcc"
| March 22 || at || 5–1 || 3–1 || –
|- align="center" bgcolor="#ffcccc"
| March 23 || at || 3–4 || 3–2 || –
|- align="center" bgcolor="#ccffcc"
| March 24 ||  || 7–5 || 4–2 || –
|- align="center" bgcolor="#ffcccc"
| March 24 ||  || 2–10 || 4–3 || –
|- align="center" bgcolor="#ccffcc"
| March 25 ||  || 11–5 || 5–3 || –
|- align="center" bgcolor="#ffcccc"
| March 26 ||  || 0–1 || 5–4 || –
|- align="center" bgcolor="#ccffcc"
| March 27 || Arizona State || 7–6 || 6–4 || –
|- align="center" bgcolor="#ffcccc"
| March 28 ||  || 6–8 || 6–5 || –
|- align="center" bgcolor="#ffcccc"
| March 28 || Chapman || 2–3 || 6–6 || –
|- align="center" bgcolor="#ccffcc"
| March 29 ||  || 6–4 || 7–6 || –
|-

|- align="center" bgcolor="#ccffcc"
| April 2 ||  || 7–1 || 8–6 || –
|- align="center" bgcolor="#ccffcc"
| April 2 || Albion || 9–6 || 9–6 || –
|- align="center" bgcolor="#ccffcc"
| April 4 ||  || 4–0 || 10–6 || –
|- align="center" bgcolor="#ccffcc"
| April 4 || Cincinnati || 11–0 || 11–6 || –
|- align="center" bgcolor="#ffcccc"
| April 6 ||  || 7–8 || 11–7 || –
|- align="center" bgcolor="#ccffcc"
| April 6 || Oakland || 6–2 || 12–7 || –
|- align="center" bgcolor="#ccffcc"
| April 9 ||  || 5–0 || 13–7 || –
|- align="center" bgcolor="#ccffcc"
| April 9 || Michigan State || 9–2 || 14–7 || –
|- align="center" bgcolor="#ffcccc"
| April 10 ||  || 3–4 || 14–8 || –
|- align="center" bgcolor="#ccffcc"
| April 10 || Lewis || 8–4 || 15–8 || –
|- align="center" bgcolor="#ccffcc"
| April 13 ||  || 7–5 || 16–8 || –
|- align="center" bgcolor="#ccffcc"
| April 13 || Detroit || 8–2 || 17–8 || –
|- align="center" bgcolor="#ccffcc"
| April 16 ||  || 8–3 || 18–8 || 1–0
|- align="center" bgcolor="#ccffcc"
| April 16 || Miami (OH) || 5–4 || 19–8 || 2–0
|- align="center" bgcolor="#ccffcc"
| April 17 ||  || 17–8 || 20–8 || 3–0
|- align="center" bgcolor="#ccffcc"
| April 17 || Ball State || 8–2 || 21–8 || 4–0
|- align="center" bgcolor="#ccffcc"
| April 23 ||  || 6–0 || 22–8 || 4–0
|- align="center" bgcolor="#ccffcc"
| April 23 || Alma || 9–2 || 23–8 || 4–0
|- align="center" bgcolor="#ffcccc"
| April 24 ||  || 3–5 || 23–9 || 4–1
|- align="center" bgcolor="#ccffcc"
| April 24 || Central Michigan || 4–0 || 24–9 || 5–1
|- align="center" bgcolor="#ccffcc"
| April 25 ||  || 9–1 || 25–9 || 5–1
|- align="center" bgcolor="#ccffcc"
| April 25 || Michigan || 5–4 || 26–9 || 5–1
|- align="center" bgcolor="#ccffcc"
| April 30 ||  || 11–1 || 27–9 || 6–1
|- align="center" bgcolor="#ccffcc"
| April 30 || Ohio || 12–2 || 28–9 || 7–1
|-

|- align="center" bgcolor="#ccffcc"
| May 1 ||  || 5–4 || 29–9 || 8–1
|- align="center" bgcolor="#ccffcc"
| May 4 || Michigan State || 12–7 || 30–9 || 8–1
|- align="center" bgcolor="#ccffcc"
| May 4 || Michigan State || 7–6 || 31–9 || 8–1
|- align="center" bgcolor="#ffcccc"
| May 7 ||  || 0–5 || 31–10 || 8–2
|- align="center" bgcolor="#ffcccc"
| May 7 || Western Michigan || 1–2 || 31–11 || 8–3
|- align="center" bgcolor="#ccffcc"
| May 8 ||  || 2–5 || 32–11 || 9–3
|- align="center" bgcolor="#ccffcc"
| May 8 || Northern Illinois || 11–1 || 33–11 || 10–3
|- align="center" bgcolor="#ccffcc"
| May 10 ||  || 5–2 || 34–11 || 10–3
|- align="center" bgcolor="#ffcccc"
| May 10 || Wayne State || 3–9 || 34–12 || 10–3
|- align="center" bgcolor="#ccffcc"
| May 14 ||  || 5–4 || 35–12 || 11–3
|- align="center" bgcolor="#ccffcc"
| May 14 || Bowling Green || 6–4 || 36–12 || 12–3
|- align="center" bgcolor="#ffcccc"
| May 15 || Detroit || 5–10 || 36–13 || 12–3
|- align="center" bgcolor="#ccffcc"
| May 19 || Michigan || 7–6 || 37–13 || 12–3
|- align="center" bgcolor="#ccffcc"
| May 19 || Michigan || 5–0 || 38–13 || 12–3
|- align="center" bgcolor="#ccffcc"
| May 23 || Detroit || 10–1 || 39–13 || 12–3
|- align="center" bgcolor="#ccffcc"
| May 23 || Detroit || 3–0 || 40–13 || 12–3
|-

|-
! style="" | Postseason
|-

|- align="center" bgcolor="#ccffcc"
| May 28 || vs Michigan || Oestrike Stadium || 6–0 || 41–13 || 12–3
|- align="center" bgcolor="#ccffcc"
| May 29 || vs  || Oestrike Stadium || 3–0 || 42–13 || 12–3
|- align="center" bgcolor="#ffcccc"
| May 30 || vs Michigan || Oestrike Stadium || 3–9 || 42–14 || 12–3
|- align="center" bgcolor="#ccffcc"
| May 30 || vs Michigan || Oestrike Stadium || 6–0 || 43–14 || 12–3
|-

|- align="center" bgcolor="#ccffcc"
| June 11 || vs  || Rosenblatt Stadium || 3–2 || 44–14 || 12–3
|- align="center" bgcolor="#ccffcc"
| June 13 || vs Clemson || Rosenblatt Stadium || 3–2 || 45–14 || 12–3
|- align="center" bgcolor="#ccffcc"
| June 15 || vs Arizona State || Rosenblatt Stadium || 2–1 || 46–14 || 12–3
|- align="center" bgcolor="#ffcccc"
| June 16 || vs Arizona || Rosenblatt Stadium || 6–11 || 46–15 || 12–3
|- align="center" bgcolor="#ffcccc"
| June 18 || vs Arizona || Rosenblatt Stadium || 1–7 || 46–16 || 12–3
|-

Awards and honors 
Dan Schmitz
 All-Tournament Team

Brian Petroff
 All-Tournament Team

Bob Owchinko
 All-Tournament Team

Hurons in the 1976 MLB Draft 
The following members of the Eastern Michigan Hurons baseball program were drafted in the 1976 Major League Baseball Draft.

References 

Eastern Michigan
Eastern Michigan Eagles baseball seasons
College World Series seasons
Eastern Michigan Eagles
Mid-American Conference baseball champion seasons